The Town of Hughenden is a former local government area in North Queensland, Australia.

History 
The Hughenden Division was established on 22 April 1882 under the Divisional Boards Act 1879. On 20 April 1887, the Borough of Hughenden was separated from it and constituted separately as a municipality for the emerging town of Hughenden.

With the passage of the Local Authorities Act 1902, the Borough of Hughenden became the Town of Hughenden on 31 March 1903.

On 15 March 1958, the Town of Hughenden was abolished and absorbed into the Shire of Flinders.

Mayors
 1887: Louis Goldring (later Member of the Queensland Legislative Assembly for Flinders)
 1927: Edward Everett Phillips

References

Former local government areas of Queensland
1958 disestablishments in Australia